Chandivali Assembly constituency is one of the 288 Vidhan Sabha constituencies of the state of Maharashtra in western India.

Overview
Chandivali (constituency number 168) is one of the 26 Vidhan Sabha constituencies located in the Mumbai Suburban district. The number of electors in 2009 was 368,233 (male 219,832, female 148,401).

Chandivali is part of the Mumbai North Central Lok Sabha constituency along with five other Vidhan Sabha segments, namely Kalina, Vile Parle, Kurla, Vandre West and Vandre East in the Mumbai Suburban district.

Members of Legislative Assembly

Election results

2019 result

Assembly elections, 2014

Assembly elections 2009

See also
 Chandivali
 List of constituencies of Maharashtra Vidhan Sabha

References

Assembly constituencies of Mumbai
Politics of Mumbai Suburban district
Assembly constituencies of Maharashtra